Cláudio Salvador Lembo (born 12 October 1934 in São Paulo) is a Brazilian lawyer, politician and university professor from Neapolitan background. He was elected Vice Governor in 2002 with Governor Geraldo Alckmin. After Alckmin's resignation, to be able to run for the presidency of Brazil in the general elections of October 2006, Lembo became governor of São Paulo on 31 March 2006. His political origins are in the ARENA pro-military party of the 1970s.

Lembo is professor of constitutional law and civil law at Mackenzie Presbyterian University.

References

|-

1934 births
Living people
Governors of São Paulo (state)
Vice Governors of São Paulo (state)
20th-century Brazilian lawyers
Brazilian people of Italian descent
University of São Paulo alumni
Academic staff of Mackenzie Presbyterian University
People from São Paulo
Democrats (Brazil) politicians

Candidates for Vice President of Brazil